Enigmata is an album of John Zorn compositions performed by Marc Ribot and Trevor Dunn, conducted by Zorn. It was released by Tzadik Records in 2011.

Recording and music
The twelve pieces are "etude-variations written in the classical tradition" by Zorn. Some parts were composed and atonal; others were improvised and conducted by Zorn. They are performed by Marc Ribot on electric guitar and Trevor Dunn on five-string electric bass.

Zorn wrote in the liner notes: "I do what I do regardless of what the outside world might think, want or expect, and although this has alienated my audience, the critical establishment and the academy countless times through my four decades of activity, the feeling that comes from creation on one's own terms far outweighs any such mundane considerations."

Release and reception
Enigmata was released by Tzadik Records in June 2011. The New York City Jazz Record reviewer suggested that it was unlikely to appeal to purists of any genre of music, and wrote that "It's daunting before you put it on and can be rather unpleasant while it is. [...] As you play the CD, however, you realize it's not as  scary and uncompromising as you might have feared".

Track listing
"Enigma One"
"Enigma Two"
"Enigma Three"
"Enigma Four"
"Enigma Five"
"Enigma Six"
"Enigma Seven"
"Enigma Eight"
"Enigma Nine"
"Enigma Ten"
"Enigma Eleven"
"Enigma Twelve"

Personnel
Trevor Dunn - 5-string electric bass
Marc Ribot - electric guitar

References

2011 albums
John Zorn albums
Albums produced by John Zorn
Tzadik Records albums